A statue of Minerva, the Roman goddess of wisdom and strategic warfare (colloquially known as ), is installed in a roundabout fountain in Guadalajara, in the Mexican state of Jalisco. It is a bronze sculpture supported by a large pedestal that names 18 notable citizens of the city. The statue has indigenous facial features and holds a spear and a shield. The phrase "May justice, wisdom and strength, guard this loyal city" is engraved as well. Initially, the statue was criticized by the citizens, but since then it has become a symbol of the city.

Description and history

A landmark of the city, the statue was built between 1956 and 1957, requested by the governor of the state, Agustín Yáñez. The statue represents the Roman goddess of wisdom and strategic warfare, Minerva. Yáñez wanted Guadalajara to be recognized as the "Athens of Mexico". It was unveiled on 15 September 1957.

It is a bronze sculpture created by Joaquín Arias and Pedro Medina Guzmán, who cast it in Aguascalientes, and the architect was Julio de la Peña. Minerva features a Late Roman ridge helmet and a goatskin aegis covers her breast. She holds a spear with her right hand and a shield with the left one. Her face has indigenous facial features as Arias modified the project, which originally requested a Greek figure. Arias modelled the statue on notable women of Jalisco that he had photographed. There is a rumor that says that Arias based on the face of Yáñez's wife. The project cost Mex$1,250,000 of which $75,000 went to Arias.

At her feet, the following slogan is written: "". Symbolically, the statue guards the city. The following 18 names are inscribed:

Valentín Gómez Farías
José Justo Corro
Mariano Otero
Ignacio L. Vallarta

Luis Pérez Verdía

José María Vigil
José López Portillo y Rojas
Enrique González Martínez

Salvador García Diego
Pablo Gutiérrez
Jacobo Gálvez
Manuel Gómez Ibarra
Andrés Cavo

The statue is hollow and it was restored in 2021 as it showed cracks in its spear, knee and torso.

Reception
Initially, the statue was received unfavorably by the city's inhabitants, as they considered it did not represent the goddess in an appropriate manner. Since then, the reception turned positive and it has become a popular destination of the city. Historian Bettina Monti Colombani found a comment that said: "If the painting of statues in this fashion continues, it won't be long before we have the Autochthon Minerva transformed into the 'green Indian'". Monti Colombani also found that the first time the statue was integrated by the citizens was in 1987 when a group of C.D. Guadalajara fans celebrated there the victory of the team. They also attempted to dress her in the team's shirt.

Notes

References

External links

 

1957 establishments in Mexico
1957 sculptures
Bronze sculptures in Mexico
Outdoor sculptures in Guadalajara
Sculptures of Roman goddesses
Sculptures of women in Mexico
Statues in Jalisco